William Edward Paultz (born July 30, 1948) is an American former professional basketball player who played in the National Basketball Association (NBA) and in the now defunct American Basketball Association (ABA). Nicknamed "the Whopper", He is a 3-time ABA All-Star and led the ABA in blocks in 1976.

Early life and collegiate career
Born in River Edge, New Jersey, Paultz played high-school basketball at River Dell Regional High School in Bergen County. Paultz played college basketball at Cameron Junior College and then at Saint John's University, and was selected in the seventh round of the 1970 NBA draft by the San Diego Rockets and by the Virginia Squires in the 1970 ABA Draft.  Paultz opted to sign with the Squires.  On August 11, 1970 the Squires traded his rights to the New York Nets in exchange for a draft choice and cash.

Professional basketball
As a rookie, Paultz made his first postseason appearance in the 1971 ABA Playoffs with the New York Nets, during which he averaged 20.2 points, 15 rebounds, and 3.2 assists per game. He spent his first five seasons, all of which resulted in trips to  the playoffs, with the ABA Nets, and was a key player in their 1973–74 ABA championship season. He was then traded to the San Antonio Spurs where he made four appearances in the playoffs, including one in an ABA championship final, from 1975 to 1979.

Although Paultz moved with a bulky stiffness, he was a very heady player. 

During the middle of the 1979-1980 season, San Antonio traded Paultz to the Houston Rockets, and due to the trade, he managed to play 84 games during an 82-game NBA season. The next year, Paultz teamed with Moses Malone to make the 1981 NBA Finals. In Game 1 of the series, Paulitz scored 14 points and grabbed 7 rebounds, during a 98-95 loss to the Celtics (who would win the series four games to two). During the 1982–83 season without Malone, and with the Rockets in last place, he was placed on waivers and picked up by the playoff-bound Spurs. In 1984, he was a late season pickup by the playoff bound Atlanta Hawks. He finished his career with the Utah Jazz in 1985.

A three time ABA All-Star, Paultz led the ABA in blocked shots during the 1975–76 season.

About his play, Paultz stated, "I have realized that I'm not an overpowering type center. I don't really know what my category is. I have always been the type of player that can do a little bit of everything."

References

External links
Paultz bio
Career statistics
where are they now

1948 births
Living people
American men's basketball players
Atlanta Hawks players
Basketball players from New Jersey
Cameron Aggies men's basketball players
Centers (basketball)
Houston Rockets players
New York Nets players
People from River Edge, New Jersey
Power forwards (basketball)
River Dell Regional High School alumni
San Antonio Spurs players
San Diego Rockets draft picks
Sportspeople from Bergen County, New Jersey
St. John's Red Storm men's basketball players
Utah Jazz players
Virginia Squires draft picks